Ondřej Štyler (born 1 June 2000) is a Czech tennis player.

Štyler has a career high ITF junior combined ranking of 13 achieved on 29 January 2018. His career high singles ranking at the ATP level is No. 1118 achieved in December 2018, sand his career high doubles ranking at the ATP level is No. 694 achieved in Jun 2019.

Štyler won the 2018 French Open – Boys' doubles title and reached the 2018 Wimbledon Championships – Boys' doubles final.

Ondrej has reach 2 doubles finals on the ITF Futures tour, and holds a 1–1 record. Partnering compatriot Tadeas Paroulek, he won his first ever senior-level professional tennis title in June 2019 at the M25+H tournament in Most, Czech Republic.

Junior Grand Slam Finals

Doubles: (1-1)

Challenger and Futures finals

Doubles: 2 (1–1)

External links
 
 

2000 births
Living people
Czech male tennis players
Tennis players from Prague
French Open junior champions
Tennis players at the 2018 Summer Youth Olympics
Grand Slam (tennis) champions in boys' doubles
Michigan Wolverines men's tennis players